Alex Story may refer to:

 Alex Story (politician), politician and retired English rower
 Alex Story (singer) ("Wolfman"; born 1974), American horror punk/heavy metal singer